Fan Hung-hsuan ( born 5 September 1946) is a Taiwanese actor who achieved regional fame in East Asia and Southeast Asia for his portrayal of Gongsun Ce in the 1993 TV series Justice Bao.

Filmography

Films

Television

References

External links 

 fanhongxuan.net (fan site)

1946 births
Living people
Taiwanese male television actors
Taiwanese male film actors
Taiwanese people from Sichuan